Urard Ó Maolconaire, Ollamh Síol Muireadaigh, died 1482.

The Annals of Connacht, sub anno 1482, say of him:

1482:Urard O Mailchonaire, ollav of Sil Murray in learning and poetry, the chief chronicler of the western world, specially learned in the phases of the moon, translator of a part of the Scriptures from Latin into Irish, died at an advanced age. Sigraid O Mailchonaire succeeded him.

External links
 http://www.ucc.ie/celt/published/T100011/index.html

Sources
 Annals of Connacht, A. Martin Freeman, Dublin, 1946.

1482 deaths
15th-century Irish historians
People from County Roscommon
15th-century Irish poets
Year of birth unknown
Irish male poets